William Henry Lyttelton, 1st Baron Lyttelton MP (24 December 1724 – 14 September 1808) was a British peer, politician, and colonial administrator from the Lyttelton family. He was the youngest son of Sir Thomas Lyttelton, 4th Baronet.

Biography 

As the youngest son, he did not expect to inherit the family estates. He made a career by serving in various government appointments. He became royal governor of colonial South Carolina in 1755, serving until 5 April 1760, during the period of the French and Indian War. This was the North American front of the Seven Years' War in Europe. He gained an alliance with the Cherokee and made a treaty with those in his territory. His insistence on respecting the treaty rights of native peoples aggravated settlers on the frontier of South Carolina, who were encroaching on their territories.

In 1760, Lyttelton was appointed Governor of Jamaica, but he was recalled to England after he lost a standoff with the Jamaican House of the Assembly, and its leader, Nicholas Bourke, over who should stand costs for the island's defence. He was appointed envoy-extraordinary to Portugal in 1766. He was raised to the Irish peerage in 1776 as Baron Westcote.

As a result of the death without issue of his nephew Thomas Lyttelton, 2nd Baron Lyttelton in 1779, William Lyttelton inherited the family baronetcy (see Lyttelton Baronets) and family estates in Frankley, Halesowen, and Hagley, including Hagley Hall.  However, the estates in Upper Arley passed to the late lord's sister Lucy, wife of Arthur Annesley, 1st Earl of Mountnorris.

In 1794, Lord Westcote was also created Baron Lyttelton in the Peerage of Great Britain. He married twice. His first wife was Martha, daughter and coheir of James Macartney of Longford and his wife; Macartney was the nephew and coheir of Ambrose Aungier, 2nd Earl of Longford. They had three children before Martha's death, including George Fulke, his successor. His second wife was Caroline Bristow, daughter of John Bristow, MP and merchant, and his wife. They had two children together, including William Henry Lyttelton, 3rd Baron Lyttelton.

References
Attig, Clarence John. "William Henry Lyttelton: A Study in Colonial Administration." PhD diss., University of Nebraska, 1958. 

Burkes Peerage and Baronetage (1939), s.v. Cobham, Viscount

Specific

External links

The William Henry Lyttelton papers William L. Clements Library.

1724 births
1808 deaths
Barons in the Peerage of Great Britain
Members of the Parliament of Great Britain for English constituencies
Streathamites
Tory MPs (pre-1834)
British MPs 1747–1754
British MPs 1754–1761
British MPs 1774–1780
British MPs 1780–1784
British MPs 1784–1790
Colonial governors of South Carolina
Diplomatic peers
Governors of Jamaica
Ambassadors of Great Britain to Portugal
Westcote of Ballymore, William Lyttelton, 1st Baron
Peers of Great Britain created by George III
Peers of Ireland created by George III
William